Paul Henri Büsser (16 January 1872 – 30 December 1973) was a French classical composer, organist, and conductor.

Biography
Büsser was born in Toulouse of partly German ancestry. He entered the Paris Conservatoire in 1889, where he studied organ with César Franck and composition with Ernest Guiraud. After serving as secretary to Charles Gounod, he received valuable advice from him, who helped him obtain a position as organist at Saint-Cloud. In 1893, he won the Prix de Rome, and on his return from Italy he began a career as a conductor. At the personal request of Claude Debussy, Büsser led the fourth performance, and numerous subsequent performances, of Pelléas et Mélisande. He also became a protégé of Jules Massenet and was one of his closest friends during the last two decades of his life (Massenet died in 1912).

In 1921, Büsser began teaching at the Paris Conservatoire, and was promoted to professor of composition in 1931. Noted students include Prix de Rome winner Henri Challan, the Japanese composer Tomojirō Ikenouchi (1906–1991) and Henri Dutilleux (1916–2013). The Académie française elected him as member in 1938. He married the famous dramatic soprano Yvonne Gall (1885–1972).

While Büsser composed a wide range of compositions, his most important works were for the stage. His operas include Daphnis et Chloé, Colomba and Les Noces corinthiennes. Several stage works demonstrate his comic wit, especially Le Carrosse du Saint Sacrement and Roxelane as well as the farce Diaforus 60, an update of Molière's Le malade imaginaire. He composed in a sophisticated compositional style with finely crafted orchestration, but remained faithful to 19th-century French tradition.

His orchestrations of Debussy's Petite suite and Printemps are considered standards, as is his crisp, authoritative conducting of the first nearly complete 1930 early electrical HMV recording of Gounod's Faust featuring the great tenor César Vezzani in the title role and the renowned bass Marcel Journet, who as a Metropolitan star had sung and recorded Méphistophelès' key arias and ensembles with Caruso on Victor acoustical records earlier in the century. These recordings have all been transferred to CD.

Late in his life, he was made a Grand Officier de la Légion d'honneur. Büsser died in Paris at the age of 101, just short of his 102nd birthday. He lived for many years at 71 Avenue Kléber.

Works

Opera
 Hélène, before 1890, incomplete
 Les Accordailles, 1890, unperformed
 Jane Grey, 1891
 Les Marivaudages, 1891, unperformed
 Daphnis et Chloé, 1897
 Le Miracle de perles, 1898, unperformed
 Blanc et noir, 1900
 Colomba, 1921
 Les Noces corinthiennes, 1922
 La Pie borgne, 1927
 Rhapsodie arménienne, 1930
 Le Carrosse du Saint-Sacrement, 1948
 Roxelane, 1948
 Diafoirus 60, 1963
 La Vénus d'ille, 1964

Ballet
 La Ronde des saisons, 1905 (Paris Opera, choreography by Joseph Hansen)

Incidental music
 Appassionato, 1910
 Les Trois sultanes, 1923
 Manon, 1925
 Histoire de France, 1929

Chamber music
 Petite suite for flute and piano, Op. 12
 Pièce for trombone and piano, Op. 33
 Appassionato for viola and piano, Op. 34, 1910
 Prelude et scherzo for flute and piano, Op. 35
 Morceau de concert (Concert Piece in D) for horn and piano, Op. 39
 Variations for trumpet in C or Bb (or cornet) and piano, Op. 53, c. 1914 (Concours du Conservatoire National de Musique Paris)
 Églogue for oboe and piano, Op. 63 (Concours du Conservatoire National de Musique de Paris)
 Catalane sur des airs populaires for viola and orchestra or piano, Op. 78, 1926
 Rhapsodie arménienne for viola and piano, Op. 81, 1930
 Andalucia sur des thèmes andalous for flute and piano, Op. 86 (Concours du Conservatoire National de Musique Paris)Aragon sur des airs populaires d' Espagne for clarinet and piano , Op. 91, c. 1934
 La Chasse de Saint Hubert for horn and piano, Op. 99, c. 1937

Writings
 De Pelléas aux Indes galantes—De la flûte au tambour (memoires), 1955

Sources
 Arthur Hoérée & Richard Langham Smith: "Büsser [Busser], (Paul-) Henri", in Stanley Sadie (ed.), The New Grove Dictionary of Opera'' (New York: MacMillan, 1992) .

External links
 Classical Composers Database Profile
 

1872 births
1973 deaths
19th-century classical composers
19th-century conductors (music)
19th-century French composers
19th-century organists
20th-century classical composers
20th-century French conductors (music)
20th-century French composers
20th-century French male musicians
Academic staff of the Conservatoire de Paris
Commandeurs of the Légion d'honneur
Conservatoire de Paris alumni
French centenarians
French male classical composers
French male conductors (music)
French opera composers
French people of German descent
Male opera composers
Prix de Rome for composition
Musicians from Toulouse
Pupils of César Franck
Pupils of Ernest Guiraud
Men centenarians